David Lim (born 1964) is a Singaporean mountaineer and motivational speaker who led the first Singapore Mount Everest Expedition in 1998. Between 1994 and 1998, he led and organised a team from the flat tropical island nation to the top of Everest. Sustaining an injury on the summit push, he did not make the summit himself though two other team members succeeded in making the top on May 25, 1998. A week after his return, and not related to the climb, he was stricken with Guillain–Barré syndrome, a rare nerve disorder where the immune system attacks the peripheral nerves. Paralysed from eyes down, he spent six months in hospitals, and emerged partially disabled in both legs.

He returned to mountaineering, and since 1999, has led more than 15 expeditions, including the first all-Singapore ascent of Argentina's Aconcagua (6962m), and the world's third solo of Ojos del Salado, the highest volcano in the world (6893m). In summer 2005, he led the first Southeast Asian team to climb virgin peaks in the Tien Shan mountain range on the Kazakh-Kyrgyz border. The team summitted three peaks, now officially recognised as Temasek, Singapura, and Ong Teng Cheong peaks. In 2009, he formed another team for the Tien Shan, summitting three more virgin peak, the highest and hardest being Majulah Peak (5152m). His last virgin peaks expedition was to the Qinghai region of China. Lim and his fellow mountaineer partner, Mohammed Rozani bin Maarof, summitted a 6000-metre virgin peak and named it Sangay Ri. In 2016, he attempted a 4 km ridge traverse encompassing two virgin peaks in the Manang region in Nepal; and continues to climbs and ski worldwide

Lim has a B.A. in Law from Cambridge University. He has also authored two books, Mountain to Climb: The Quest for Everest and Beyond and Against Giants: The Life and Climbs of a Disabled Mountaineer, both published by Epigram Books. His third book, How Leaders Lead: 71 Lessons in Leading Yourself & Others is self-published.

Lim is owner of a leadership and coaching consultancy (Everest Motivation Team Pte Ltd) and has delivered programmes and keynote presentations in 75 cities and 33 countries, combining experiences in leadership in the mountains with corporate models; and delivering presentations and workshops around the world. His leadership and team simulation, Everest Challenger® - .® has been licensed in 13 countries, and is the first tabletop simulation of climbing Mt Everest, designed for adult learning outcomes. He earned the Certified Speaking Professional (CSP) credential in 2009, making him the first Singaporean to acquire this amongst the 600 CSPs in the 6000-strong Global Speaker Federation.  In 2013, together with 30 leading global speakers, he received the designation of  CSPGlobal (now known as the Global Speaking Fellow)

References 

Mountaineering guru David Lim on the complex relationship between climbers and sherpas
Mountaineering guru explains the complex climber-sherpa relationship

American Alpine Journal report on virgin peak ascent by David Lim and team
http://publications.americanalpineclub.org/articles/12200831400/Temasek-4374m-Singapura-I-4589m4550m-Ong-Teng-Cheong-4743m-First-Ascents

External links
 Everest Motivation Team Pte Ltd
 David Lim Speaks Pte Ltd
 Expeditions website

Singaporean mountain climbers
Singaporean people of Chinese descent
Singaporean motivational speakers
Living people
1964 births